Step Out may refer to:

Music
Step Out (Busy Signal album)

Songs
"Step Out", song by The Mamas and The Papas J. Phillips 1971
"Step Out", song by Oasis withdrawn due to similarities to Stevie Wonder's "Uptight"
"Step Out, Comrades, Together", revolutionary Russian song arranged by Shostakovich
"Step Out", song by 	Dangerous Girls	1981
"Step Out", song by 	Jerry Paul